Eremochrysa is a genus of shadow lacewings in the family Chrysopidae. There are about 18 described species in Eremochrysa.

Species

References

Further reading

 
 
 
 
 
 
 
 

Chrysopidae
Neuroptera genera